D cell can mean:
 D battery, a common size of dry-cell electrical battery
 D cell (biology), a hormone secreting, regulatory cell type found in the stomach

See also
 DCell, one of the Data center network architectures
 dCell, a division of Lowe Lintas